Taché or variation, may refer to:

 tache, or mustache

Places
 Rural Municipality of Taché, Manitoba, Canada
 Tache Avenue, Winnipeg, a street in Saint Boniface, Manitoba, Canada
 Boulevard Alexandre-Taché, a street in Gatineau, Quebec, Canada
 La Tâche, Charente, France
 La Tache, California, USA
 Le Tâche, a mountain in the Chablais Alps

People
 Tache Papahagi (1892-1977) Ottoman-Romanian folklorist
 Tache Ionescu (1858-1922) Romanian politician
 Tache Gianni (1838-1902) Romanian politician

Surnamed
 Alexandre Taché (politician) (1899-1961), Canadian politician
 Alexandre-Antonin Taché (1823–1894), Canadian Catholic archbishop
 Aurélien Taché (born 1984) French politician
 Étienne-Paschal Taché (1795–1865), Canadian politician
 Eugène-Étienne Taché (1836-1912), Canadian engineer
 Jean Taché (1698-1768), French merchant
 Jean-Baptiste Taché (1786-1849), Canadian politician
 Joseph-Charles Taché (1820-1894), Canadian medical doctor
 Pascal Taché (1757-1830), Canadian merchant

Other uses
 La Tâche AOC, a French wine controlled origin label

See also

 Tache-Psyche Effect
 Sans Tache, California, USA;
 Sans Tache, motto of the Scottish Clan Napier
 Alexandre Taché (disambiguation)
 Tache noir (disambiguation)